Chan Hao-ching and Kristina Mladenovic were the defending champions, but Mladenovic decided not to participate. Chan played alongside Chan Yung-jan but lost in the first round to Anna-Lena Friedsam and Alison Van Uytvanck.

Caroline Garcia and Yaroslava Shvedova won the tournament, defeating Friedsam and Van Uytvanck in the final, 6–3, 6–3.

Seeds

Draw

References 
 Draw

OEC Taipei WTA Ladies Open - Doubles
Taipei WTA Ladies Open
2013 in Taiwanese tennis